Isalys ("Ice") Briana Quiñones (born October 23, 1997) is a Puerto Rican basketball player. She played college basketball for Dartmouth from 2015 to 2019. She represents the senior Puerto Rican national team in international national team competitions.

She participated in the 2018 FIBA Women's Basketball World Cup. Quiñones was the top performer at FIBA's Women's Olympic pre-qualifying tournament 2019 in Edmonton, Canada in the game between Puerto Rico vs. Dominican Republic and FIBA's Olympic pre-qualifying tournament 2020 in Bourges, France in the game between Puerto Rico vs. France. She represented Puerto Rico at the Tokyo 2020 Olympics.

Early life 

The daughter of a county employee and his wife, a retired Naval officer, Quiñones inherited her height from her father who is 6'3" (1.91m). She started playing basketball at the age of five at the South Bay YMCA. By the time she was in sixth grade, she was the tallest in her class, contributing to unwelcome bullying. Nonetheless, her height was key to Joseph Casillas Elementary Lady Comets basketball team winning the first ever championship in 2007. As Captain, she led the team to three unprecedented basketball championships in a row. On June 9, 2009, Joseph Casillas Elementary School, declared that number 25 shall not be worn by any student athlete representing Casillas Elementary.

High school career 
As a four-year starter for Otay Ranch girls Varsity basketball team, Quiñones recorded 1,289 total points (11.7 PPG), 930 rebounds (8.5 RPG), 45% in 2-pt Field Goals, 23% in 3-pt Field Goals, 70% free throws, 246 steals, 207 blocks, 176 assists, 32 Double-Doubles and one Triple-Double (11 points, 17 rebounds and 11 blocks). As a freshman (2011-2012), she started every game averaging 7.6 PPG and 5.9RPG.

As a sophomore (2012-2013), she averaged 12.2 PPG and 8.2 RPG, recorded five Double-Doubles and helped the team to 19-9 records while elevating the team to the first playoffs appearance in school history. On December 12, 2013, she was highlighted in The San Diego Union Tribune as 2012-2013 girls basketball players to watch.

She flourished by her junior year (2013-2014). As co-captain of the team, she averaged 17.9 PPG and 11.7 RPG and recorded 18 Double-Doubles. On December 21, 2013, she was named MaxPreps Player of the Game (27 pts, 14 rebounds, 3 blks) in the game against Morse High School. On January 21, 2014, she was named MaxPreps Player of the Game (18pts, 18 rebounds) in the game against San Diego High School. On January 25, 2014, she was named MaxPreps Player of the Game (25 pts, 17 rebounds, 6 blocks, 9-12 free throws) in the game against Olympian High School. With only approximately two miles separating Otay Ranch and Olympian, the rivalry between the schools was strong. "In the end, the team [sic] held their lead and defeated Olympian for the first time in school history in OT, with a final score of 66-63." On February 5, she was named MaxPreps Player of the Game (37 pts, 25 rebounds) in the game against Bonita Vista High School. She was recognized by The Mighty 1090 as Female Athlete of the Week. On February 11, she was named San Diego Union Tribune Athlete of the Week. On February 15, she was named Player of the Game (31 pts, 15 rebounds, 6 blks) in the game against Montgomery High School. With a 17-13 record, the Lady Mustangs earned their first home playoff game and the first playoff win in school history against Patrick Henry High School. She was named to the 2013-2014 First Team All-League for the Metro Mesa Conference.

As a senior (2014-2015), Quiñones averaged 11.4 PPG and 10.3 RPG. She led the Lady Mustangs to the first road playoff victory against higher ranked Imperial High School. On December 7, 2014, the Lady Mustangs defeated Castle Park Trojans with a final score of 40-25. Quiñones was identified as a key varsity player. On December 8, she was named MaxPreps Player of the game in the game against Castle Park High School, where she recorded her first Double-Double. On December 30, 2014, she was named MaxPreps Player of the Game (26pts, 14 rebounds, 2 blocks) in the game against Castle Park High School. On February 12, 2015, she was named MaxPreps Player of the Game  (11 pts, 21 rebounds, 11 blocks) in the game against Bonita Vista High School. She graduated with a 4.3 GPA.

She also played Amateur Athletic Union (AAU) ball with the San Diego Sol Fire and San Diego Sol Elite.

College career 
Exceeding both in the classroom and in the basketball court, Quiñones earned enrollment to Dartmouth College. Under the direction of Coach Belle Koclanes, Quiñones joined the class of 2019. Koclanes recognized Quiñones as "naturally gifted, 6-3 presence on the floor with skill sets that are really just scratching the surface.  She has the ability to score from the perimeter as well as in the paint and defensively has the length to majorly disrupt opponents.  Most importantly, Ice is a consummate teammate who takes great pride in taking care of her family."

As a Freshman (2015-2016), she played in nine games, averaged 0.4 points and 0.6 rebounds while averaging three minutes per game.

As a Sophomore (2016-2017), she started 21 of 27 games played, was second on the team with 22 blocks, averaged 9.1 points per game, scored a career-high 23 points in Dartmouth's 4OT thriller vs. Columbia (1/27), grabbed a career-high 13 rebounds and five steals vs. Albany (12/29), tallied six double-doubles, scored 18 points and grabbed 11 rebounds and dished three assists vs. Harvard (1/21), shot 41.8 percent from the field and made 74 of 94 free throw attempts.

As a Junior (2017-2018), she started 19 of 25 games played, led the team in total rebounds with 163 and offensive boards with 48, averaged 6.5 per game, was first on the team with 18 blocks, third on the team in scoring, averaged 10.5 points per game and had the most rebounds in nine different games, including wins over Vermont (11/10), NJIT (11/26) and Yale (1/27 and 2/16). She scored a season-high 22 points against Princeton (2/23), one point away from matching her career-high, second on the team in steals with 23, recorded double-doubles against Vermont, NJIT and in both Yale games, posted the team-best blocked shots in a single game against Columbia (2/3) with three, one of two players to play all 45 minutes at Yale (2/16) and played all 40 minutes in three other games. She helped set team records for most points scored in a quarter against Columbia (35 pts; 2/3) and for single-season three-point field goals made and attempted (187-473). In the first Big Green’s home victory over the Harvard (63-58) since January 2013, Quiñones had 10 points and five rebounds.

As a Senior (2018-2019), Quiñones was named Second Team All-Ivy League. She started in all 27 games of the season for the Big Green, led the team with 14.0 points per game, first on the team with 18 blocked shots, second with 6.3 rebounds per game, and third on the team with 34 steals per game. She led team in rebounding in 11 different games, tied career high in points with 23 against Brown (2/23), and scored in double figures in 20 different games. In the first road season game against Vernmont, Quiñones scored 22 points, grabbing seven rebounds and contributing three steals for the win.  On November 9, 2018,  in the game against Loyola University Maryland, Quiñones led on the offensive end with a double-double of ten points and 12 rebounds.  On November 11, 2018, she once again led the way, scoring 22 points on 9 of 17 shooting and adding seven rebounds and three steals. On November 2018, in the game against the UC Santa Barbara, she led Dartmouth with 20 points and six rebounds. On December 9, 2018, she led the way for Dartmouth with 18 points, four rebounds and two steals. Dartmouth went to beat Cornell (63-56) on the road with Quiñones scoring 19 points and nine rebounds. She was 5 for 7 from the arc. Dartmouth went to beat Columbia 70-69 on the road with Quiñones hitting a pair of free throws with 4 seconds left to give the Big Green a win over the Lions. She had a game-high 21 points. On February 22, 2019, Dartmouth beat Yale at home in a thrilling buzzer-beating put-back from Paula Lenart '20, when Quiñones attempted a three-pointer with six seconds to go for the win (56-54). She led the team with 18 points. The next day during the game against Brown, Quiñones led the Big Green with 23 points for the win (78-43).

Upon graduation, she was awarded the Gail Koziara '82 Most Valuable Player Award.

She earned a Dartmouth College Bachelor of Arts in Environmental Engineering on June 9, 2019 and will earned a Bachelor of Science in Engineering in March 2020 from Dartmouth College - Thayer School of Engineering. She also received the John C. Woodhouse Environmental Engineering Prize which is awarded annually for the best work in the field of environmental study of research.

Dartmouth statistics

Source

National team career 
In 2017, Quiñones' parents reached out to Puerto Rico's National Team management to understand the process for consideration into the program. Puerto Rico's National Team program consisted of a forty players roster. Depending on the availability of the players and management decisions, players were invited to the tryouts. In preparation for the Centrobasket and Pre-World Cup 2017 Tournament, Quiñones was one of several players invited to the tryouts. The Centrobasket would grant three teams the opportunity to compete in the Pre-World Cup 2017 Tournament. Several new players were invited to the tryouts as Puerto Rico's Federation (FBPUR) President Yum Ramos expressed this was an opportunity for a generational turnover. On June 26, 2017, Quiñones was listed on the official roster for Centrobasket 2017. The intent of the new roster was to rejuvenate the team. They brought energy and speed commented Jerry Batista, the National team coach. Coach Batista touted the selected group as "hungry, athletic, and quick". The Centrobasket Tournament 2017 was held in St. Thomas Virgin Island on July 13, 2017. In the game against Jamaica, Quiñones scored 12 points to secure a win 90-44. In the game against Bahamas, Quiñones scored eight points for the 69-42 win. Puerto Rico earned the Bronze Medal.

Shortly after 2017 Centrobasket, Quiñones made the roster for Americup 2017. Puerto Rico was part of Group B which included Paraguay, Canada, Cuba and Mexico. The youngest player in the team, Quiñones was recognized by Coach Batista as a player with great expectations and the future of the National team. The Americup 2017 tournament was held in Argentina from 6 to 13 August 2017. Puerto Rico went on to win the Bronze medal with historic win (75-68) against Brazil, earning their World Cup ticket.

In July 2018, Quiñones made the roster for the 2018 Central American Games held in Barranquilla, Colombia. Coach Batista identified Quiñones as a key player in the team. In the game against Guatemala, she contributed 11 points for the win (112-36). The team won the Bronze medal.

In August 2018, Quiñones made the roster for the 2018 Centrobasket in Manati, Puerto Rico. In this tournament, Puerto Rico initially faced Bahamas, Costa Rica and Mexico in group B. Puerto Rico secured the ticket to Americup 2019, earning the Gold Medal.

In September 2018, Quiñones made the roster for the 2018 World Cup celebrated in Tenerife, Spain. Puerto Rico played against Japan, Belgium and Spain as part of Group B. After the tournament, she returned to Dartmouth College to complete her studies.

From July 26 to August 11, 2019, Quiñones participated in the 2019 Pan American games in Lima, Peru. She was a big factor in the success of team Puerto Rico earning the Bronze medal. She averaged 7.4 PPG,and 4.2 RPG in just over 22 minutes per game. Her best performance when it mattered most in the bronze medal game, she had 12 points, five rebounds and a steal. She had 11 points, four rebounds and a block against Canada and eight points, five boards, one steal and a block against team USA.

In September 2019, Quiñones took part of the 2019 Americup Tournament held in Puerto Rico. Puerto Rico was part of Group A which included Dominican Republic, Cuba, Canada and Mexico. Quiñones had key 3-pointers that contributed to the win against Cuba (80-55). Puerto Rico came in 4th place.

Quiñones was the top performer at FIBA's Women's Olympic pre-qualifying tournament 2019 in Edmonton, Canada in the game between Puerto Rico and the Dominican Republic and FIBA's Olympic pre-qualifying tournament 2020 in Bourges, France in the game between Puerto Rico and France. She will be representing Puerto Rico at the Tokyo 2020 Olympics.

References

External links
Dartmouth Big Green bio

1997 births
Living people
Basketball players at the 2019 Pan American Games
Basketball players at the 2020 Summer Olympics
Basketball people from California
Dartmouth Big Green women's basketball players
Olympic basketball players of Puerto Rico
Pan American Games medalists in basketball
Power forwards (basketball)
Puerto Rican women's basketball players
Sportspeople from Chula Vista, California
Central American and Caribbean Games bronze medalists for Puerto Rico
Competitors at the 2018 Central American and Caribbean Games
Pan American Games bronze medalists for Puerto Rico
Central American and Caribbean Games medalists in basketball
Medalists at the 2019 Pan American Games